The cuisine of Odesa, Ukraine is influenced by various cultures and regions, including Russia, Jewish culture, Georgia, France, Germany, Italy, Armenia, Uzbekistan, Bulgaria, Moldova, and Greece. However, many recipes are indigenous to Odesa, with fusion cuisine being common.

Typical dishes

Appetizers 
Vorschmack
Aubergine dip ("Aubergine caviar")
Tzimmes
"Bull's heart" tomato appetizer with bryndza
Baked peppers with garlic
Loader's sandwich from Privoz
Meze Odesa style

Meat  
Essig-fleisch, beef stew with prunes
Gefilte helzele, stuffed chicken neck
Stuffed peppers
Cabbage rolls "little fingers" and dolma

Fish and seafood 
Gefilte fish
Fried gobies
Fried flounder
Marinated fish
Danube herring with baby potatoes
Roe cutlets
Odesa mussels
Pilaf with mussels
Black sea mussels on the beach
Rapanas baked with cheese and garlic
Rachki (small shrimps)
Black Sea sprat cutlets
Deep-fried Black Sea sprats or tsatsa

Other 
Fried semolina
Salamur, a sauce based on brine, garlic, spices, served to the ear, or used as a dressing for vegetables
Odesa borscht with gobies  
Placinte
“5 minutes” pickled cucumbers

Desserts 
Varenyky with cherries
White cherry jam
Vertuta
Blintzes (nalistniki) “little fingers” with quark
Napoleon cake
Walnut stuffed prunes

Overview 

Due to its coastal location, Odesa cuisine includes a large number of seafood dishes.
The most popular dish is gefilte fish, which is served on holidays using several types of fish, mainly pike, mullet or redlip mullet, carp, and pike perch. Fried fish is also popular. Preference is given to the Black Sea flounder and gobies. Cutlets are fried from small fish of the herring family, mainly Black Sea sprats. Pilaf with mussels is a popular Odesa seafood dish. Mussels are often fried on-site on large sheets of iron.

A traditional snack in Odesa is boiled shrimp, called "rachki", in the Odesite slang.

Among cold appetizers, vorschmack is especially popular, as well as a dip made from grilled aubergines.

Stuffed chicken neck (gefilte helzele) and  stuffed vegetables (bell peppers, zucchini, and aubergines) are very popular.

Another feature of Odesa cuisine is the tendency to reduce the size of individual food items while keeping the portion size unchanged. For example, pelmeni and varenyky, when interpreted by Odesa chefs, look different than the more traditional versions. In Odesa, pelmeni and varenyky are served at a small size, whereas varenyky in Ukrainian cuisine are as large as a fist. The most popular type of varenyky are cherry varenyky. Cabbage rolls in the Odesa culinary tradition are also made in a smaller size than is traditional elsewhere, with a preferred size called “the little finger.” A popular dessert, called nalistniki (blintzes with quark), is also quite small.

Odesa specialties 

The specialties of Odesa and the Odesa region include:

 The forty-day potato variety grown in the village of Roksolany. This variety is distinguished by a short ripening period and excellent taste. The "forty-day” from Roksolany is considered the best potato variety in Odesa for making mashed potatoes and roasts;
 White crayfish from the village of Mayaki. Once, the Dniester estuary was considered the best place in the world for catching crayfish. The crayfish market no longer operates on an industrial scale; however, crayfish from Mayaki continue to be one of the most popular beer snacks in Odesa.
 The Mikado tomato is an early ripening variety that takes 90–95 days from germination to ripening. The plants are tall (1 - 1.2 meters high). The fruits are flat and rounded, with an average weight of 150 - 200 g. This variety has a very high-quality taste and is used in salads in Odesa cuisine. (Salad with Mikado and sheep cheese is especially popular).
 Gobies are fish of the perch family. In Odesa, gobies are divided into whips, herbalists, round timber, and sandpitters. They are caught with a donkey fishing rod, then fried or stewed in tomato. They can also be salted and dried, and served with beer.

 Black-Sea turbot is a fish of the Scophthalmidae family. Two species are caught in coastal waters: Kalkan and brill. Kalkan is one of the largest members of the family, reaching a length of 115 cm and a weight of up to 28 kg. The second species, brill, differs from Kalkan, first of all in size: brillsare smaller, and in habitat: they live at shallower depths and closer to the coast.
 Black Sea sprat is a small commercial sea fish of the herring family. In Odesa it is often called "sardelle". Not to be confused with Atherinaor European anchovy, the taste of which is somewhat poorer.
 Aubergine is a popular vegetable in Odesa cuisine. It is the main ingredient in aubergine dip.

 Bryndza, brine cheese made from cow, goat or sheep milk. It is used for making sandwiches, snacks, and salads, as well as hot dishes (for example, mamaliga) and as a filling for pastries. Aged Bessarabian sheep bryndza, salted in barrels, is especially popular among gourmet Odesa cuisine. It is usually soaked in fresh water for several hours before use.
 Frogs from Vilkovo are used to cook deep-fried frog legs. The city of Vilkovo in the Kiliysky district of the Odesa region became famous for eating and breeding frogs for export to France and other European countries.
 Odesa mussels
 Urda is a cheese made in Bessarabia from whey and sheep's milk. Used for making "quick" bread - gözleme.
 Bessarabian paprika is a spice made from a sweet variety of red pepper, in a pestle and mortar, and pound with vegetable oil. One of the most frequently used spices in Bessarabian cuisine.

 Rachki, Black Sea herbal shrimp (Palaemon adspersus), has a high industrial value, is caught in the Black and Azov seas. Rachki are Odesa chips. Most often they are boiled, sometimes fried in a pan with garlic.

Books about Odesa cuisine

References

External links  
 Odessa food guide
 A history of Odessa in 10 dishes
 A Foodie Guide to Odessa: the up and coming city no one talks about
 About Odessa cuisine
 A history of Odessa in 10 dishes
Odesa
Culture of Odesa
Jewish cuisine
European cuisine